The Bandarwela Dharmasoka Madya Maha Vidyalaya (Bandarawela Dharmasoka Central College) is a public school situated in Uva Province, Sri Lanka. It was founded in 1932 as a Buddhist school.  It is a provincial school controlled by the Uva Provincial Council and provides both Primary and Secondary education. Bandarawela Dharmasoka Central College has produced many of the undergraduates from Badulla District for local universities yearly.

2500 students are guided by 160 teachers. The primary, the secondary, and advanced level sections consist of one to thirteen grades. The school has an ICT laboratory, Science laboratories, and auditorium, a library, and home science unit 

View on Google Map:Dharmashoka Map

Provincial schools in Sri Lanka
Schools in Bandarawela